Bondia maleficana is a moth in the family Carposinidae. It was described by Edward Meyrick in 1882. It is found in Australia, where it has been recorded from Queensland and New South Wales.

References

Carposinidae
Moths described in 1882